Nicolas Figère (born 19 May 1979 in Moulins) is a male hammer thrower from France. His personal best throw is 80.88 metres, achieved in July 2001 in Amsterdam.

In 2007 he tested positive for doping, in an in-competition test conducted at the 2007 European Cup in Munich. He received a one-month suspension.

Achievements

References

Sportspeople from Moulins, Allier
1979 births
Living people
French male hammer throwers
Doping cases in athletics
French sportspeople in doping cases
Athletes (track and field) at the 2012 Summer Olympics
Olympic athletes of France
Mediterranean Games bronze medalists for France
Mediterranean Games medalists in athletics
Athletes (track and field) at the 2005 Mediterranean Games